D.B. Gangodathenna (born May 28, 1943 as ඩී. බී. ගංගොඩතැන්නේ) [Sinhala]), is an actor in Sri Lankan cinema, stage drama and television. Gangodathenna act in supportive comedy roles particularly in cinema.

Acting career
Gangodathenna started his film career with Mathu Yam Dawasa back in 2001, directed by Dharmasena Pathiraja.

Notable television works

 Boralu Paara
 Deveni Athmaya
 Dhawala Kadulla 
 Hatara Kenderaya
 Kasee Salu 
 Kethumathi Neyo 
 Kinnara Damanaya 
 Manmaadhawee
 Maya Ranaga 
 Sanda Dev Diyani

Filmography

References

External links

Sri Lankan male film actors
Sinhalese male actors
Living people
1943 births